Pultenaea indira is a species of flowering plant in the family Fabaceae and is endemic to the south-west of Western Australia. It is an erect or low-lying shrub with plate-like or fissured bark near the base, densely hairy stems above, linear to lance-shaped leaves with the narrower end towards the base, and yellow, red and maroon flowers.

Description

Taxonomy and naming
Pultenaea indira was first formally described in 2005 by Lindy A. Orthia and Michael Crisp in the journal Nuytsia from specimens collected by Margaret G. Corrick in Cape Arid National Park in 1985. The specific epithet (indira) honours "the Australian weed ecologist and environmental activist, Indira Narayan".

In the same paper, Orthia and Crisp described three subspecies, and the names are accepted by the Australian Plant Census:
 Pultenaea indira Orthia & Crisp subsp. indira has smooth, glabrous leaves;
 Pultenaea indira subsp. monstrosita Orthia has slightly warty, densely hairy leaves;
 Pultenaea indira subsp. pudoides Orthia has slightly warty, sparsely hairy leaves.

Distribution and habitat
Subspecies indira grows in a range of habitats from woodland to low heath including in rocky places, the edges of salt lakes and disturbed areas. It is widely distributed from the Cape Arid National Park to Ravensthorpe and Lake King with scattered populations further inland. Subspecies monstrosita grows in mallee on gentle slopes and flats mainly between Ravensthorpe, Lake King and the Fitzgerald River National Park. Subspecies pudoides grows in tall heath or low scrub near Narrogin and Corrigin.

Conservation status
Pultenaea indira subsp. indira is classified as "not threatened" but subsp. monstrosita is listed as "Priority Three" meaning that it is poorly known and known from only a few locations but is not under imminent threat, and subsp. pudoides as "Priority Two" by the Western Australian Government Department of Biodiversity, Conservation and Attractions, meaning that it is poorly known and from only one or a few locations.

References

indira
Eudicots of Western Australia
Plants described in 2005